Onarga is the name of a village and a township in the United States:

 Onarga, Illinois
 Onarga Township, Iroquois County, Illinois